The periodization of ancient Egypt is the use of periodization to organize the 3,000-year history of ancient Egypt. The system of 30 dynasties recorded by third-century BC Greek-speaking Egyptian priest Manetho is still in use today; however, the system of "periods" and "kingdoms" used to group the dynasties is of modern origin (19th and 20th centuries CE). The modern system consists of three "Golden Ages" (Old, Middle, and New Kingdoms), interspersed between "intermediate periods" (often considered times of crisis or Dark Ages) and early and late periods.

Old, Middle and New Kingdoms

Bunsen
In his 1844–1857 , Christian Charles Josias von Bunsen became the first Egyptologist to propose what became the modern tripartite division for Egypt's history:
  ("Old Empire") = Menes until the beginning of the 13th Dynasty
  ("Middle Empire") = Hyksos until the 17th Dynasty
  ("New Empire") = from the 18th Dynasty onward

Bunsen explained, in the English translation of his 1844 work, how he came to derive the three Kingdoms:

Compared to the modern arrangement, Bunsen's Old Empire included what is today known as the Middle Kingdom, whereas Bunsen's Middle Empire is today known as the Second Intermediate Period.

Lepsius
Bunsen's student Karl Richard Lepsius primarily used a bipartite system in his 1849–1858 :
  = dynasties 1–16
  = dynasties 17–31

Other scholars
Auguste Mariette's 1867 :
Old Kingdom = Dynasties 1–10
Middle Kingdom = Dynasties 11–17
New Kingdom = Dynasties 18–30

Alfred Wiedemann's :
Prehistory = Dynasties 1–11 
Middle Kingdom = Dynasties 12–19 
New Kingdom = Dynasties 20–31

Henri Gauthier's 1907–1917 :
 ("Ancient Empire") = Dynasties 1–10
 ("Middle Empire")= Dynasties 11–17
 ("New Empire") = Dynasties 17–25
 ("Saito-Persian period") = Dynasties 26–31
 ("Macedonian–Greek period") = Dynasties 32 (Macedonian) and 33 (Ptolemaic)

Intermediate periods

First Intermediate Period
19th-century Egyptology did not use the concept of "intermediate periods"; these were included as part of the preceding periods "as times of interval or transition".

In 1926, after the First World War, Georg Steindorff's Die Blütezeit des Pharaonenreiches and Henri Frankfort's Egypt and Syria in the First Intermediate Period assigned dynasties 6–12 to the terminology "First Intermediate Period". The terminology had become well established by the 1940s.

Second Intermediate Period
In 1942, during the Second World War, German Egyptologist Hanns Stock's Studien zur Geschichte und Archäologie der 13. bis 17. Dynastie fostered use of the term "Second Intermediate Period".

Third Intermediate Period
In 1978, British Egyptologist Kenneth Kitchen's book The Third Intermediate Period in Egypt (1100–650 BC) coined the term "Third Intermediate Period".

Modern periodization

Notes

Bibliography

 

Periodization
Ancient Egypt
Historiography